Raemian Caelitus, previously known as Raemian Ichon Rex, is a complex of three luxury high-rise residential towers in Seoul, South Korea. Tower 101 is Seoul's 12th tallest building and the tallest in Yongsan District. The complex was completed in 2015. Overlooking the Han River in central Seoul, the towers are a prominent sight from the banks of the river.

References

External links
 http://raemian.co.kr/sales/ichon
 
 
 

Skyscrapers in Seoul
Residential skyscrapers in South Korea
Residential buildings completed in 2015
2015 establishments in South Korea